Tim Karalexis (born September 18, 1980 in Weymouth, Massachusetts) is an American soccer player, currently without a club.

Career

Youth and College
Karalexis attended Weymouth High School, graduating in 1998. While at Weymouth, he led the school’s soccer team to the Massachusetts Division I championship and was named the Boston Globe Division I Player of the Year.  He then attended Saint Anselm College, playing on the school’s NCAA Division II soccer team from 1998 to 2001. He was a second team All American in both 2000 and 2001.

Professional
In 2002, Karalexis went on trial with the Charleston Battery of the USL First Division, before signing  with the Wilmington Hammerheads of the USL Second Division. In 2003 and 2004 he was selected as a first team USL-2 All Star, and he was also the 2004 USL-2 Defender of the Year.  On October 28, 2004, he signed with the Charleston Battery.

On December 5, 2007, the Battery traded Karalexis to the Portland Timbers in exchange for Luke Kreamalmeyer, and scored on his Timbers debut. On July 16, 2007, the Orlando Sharks of Major Indoor Soccer League selected Karalexis in the third round of the MISL Supplemental Draft, but he declined to sign with them.

Karalexis rejoined the Wilmington Hammerheads in 2009.

Honors

Wilmington Hammerheads
USL Second Division Regular Season Champions (1): 2009

References

External links
 Wilmington Hammerheads bio
 Charleston Battery bio
 Portland Timbers bio

1980 births
Living people
American soccer players
Charleston Battery players
Association football defenders
Sportspeople from Weymouth, Massachusetts
Portland Timbers (2001–2010) players
Soccer players from Massachusetts
USL First Division players
USL Second Division players
Wilmington Hammerheads FC players
Saint Anselm College alumni